Corroded Disorder is a compilation album by electro-industrial band Front Line Assembly. It contains tracks from three previous releases, Corrosion, Disorder, and Convergence, as well as two bonus tracks. The release leaves out "Conflict" and "The Wrack Part III – Wisdom" from Corrosion. While the former appeared on Convergence, the latter has never been released on CD.

Track listing

Personnel

Front Line Assembly
 Bill Leeb – vocals, electronic instruments
 Rhys Fulber – electronic instruments (1, 5, 11, 14–16)
 Michael Balch – electronic instruments (2–4, 6–10, 12, 13), engineering (2, 5, 6, 8, 14–16)

Technical personnel
 Greg Reely – engineering (1)
 Dave Ogilvie – engineering (3, 4, 7, 9–13)
 Delwyn Brooks – assistant engineering (1)
 Dave McKean – design, illustration, photography

References

Front Line Assembly compilation albums
1995 compilation albums
Albums with cover art by Dave McKean
Cleopatra Records albums
Industrial compilation albums